The Zee Cine Awards Telugu is an awards ceremony for the Telugu cinema and Telugu music. They were instituted in December 2017, under the name Zee Telugu Golden Awards to award the excellence in Telugu cinema and Telugu Music.

History 
Zee Telugu, a Telugu cable television channel of the Essel Group's Zee Entertainment Enterprise Limited (ZEEL) has announced in 2017 to start an awards ceremony to honour the best from Tollywood (Telugu) and Telugu music.

The Award ceremony was first held at Annapurna Studios in Hyderabad, India on 17th December 2017.

See also 

 Telugu cinema
 Cinema of India
 Cinema of South India
 Zee Telugu

References

Indian film awards
Telugu cinema
Telugu music
Indian music awards
2020 Indian film awards
2019 Indian film awards
2018 Indian film awards
2017 Indian film awards